Akada (written: 赤田 lit. "red field") is a Japanese surname. Notable people with the surname include:

, Japanese baseball player
, Japanese baseball player

Japanese-language surnames